The long, hot summer of 1967 refers to the more than 150 race riots that erupted across the United States in the summer of 1967. In June there were riots in Atlanta, Boston, Cincinnati, Buffalo, and Tampa. In July there were riots in Birmingham, Chicago, Detroit, Minneapolis, Milwaukee, Newark, New Britain, New York City, Plainfield, Rochester, and Toledo.

The most destructive riots of the summer took place in July, in Detroit and Newark; many contemporary newspapers headlines described them as "battles". As a result of the rioting in the summer of 1967 and the preceding two years, President Lyndon B. Johnson established the Kerner Commission to investigate the rioting and urban issues of Black Americans.

History
A history of institutionalized unemployment, abusive policing, and poor housing was already present in certain areas of the United States. Riots began to flare up across the country but especially during the summer months. With rioting in urban areas across the country, and the Summer of Love occurring in hippie communities, Americans were witnessing US troop movements in the Vietnam War shown on the nightly television news. At the end of July, President Lyndon B. Johnson set up the Kerner Commission to investigate the riots; in 1968 it released a report blaming pervasive societal inequalities in American ghettos for the riots. By September 1967, 83 people were dead, thousands were injured, tens of millions of dollars worth of property had been destroyed and entire neighborhoods had been burned.

Reactions
It is in the context of having been through the "long, hot, summer" that in December 1967, Miami police chief Walter E. Headley uttered the now-infamous phrase, "When the looting starts, the shooting starts", after which Frank Rizzo, Richard Daley and George Wallace also spoke out in favor of a hardline approach towards looters and rioters. The Republicans, although a minority party in the House of Representatives, were split over how to respond to the rioting, despite common historiographical perceptions which depict them as being entirely in favor of a "law and order" styled approach.

In early July 1967, the Justice Department met with local media to ask for "restraint in reporting". In December of the same year, The New York Times asked a psychologist about "deterrents" and was told that the riots would continue.

Polling 
In a March 1968 Harris poll reported in The Washington Post, 37% of Americans agreed with the Kerner Commission's report that the 1967 race riots were brought on mainly by inequalities; 49% disagreed. A majority of whites (53%) rejected the idea, with just 35% agreeing. In contrast, 58% of blacks supported it, and only 17% disagreed.

Political response 
Throughout the summer that year, both the Republican and Democratic parties were split on how to handle the riots. In both parties two factions existed: one that advocated for law and order, and another that supported an approach based on social justice. Democrats held the majority of seats in both Houses of Congress while the Republicans held the minority. Despite common historiographical perceptions that depict the Republicans as being entirely in favor of a "law and order" styled approach to the riots, there was division in the party. President Johnson's popularity levels decreased that summer because of the riots.

During July, conservatives in the Republican Party dominated its response to the riots. Republicans believed this would be an opportunity to attack President Johnson and his War on Poverty initiative. Many Republicans would end up blaming Johnson for what happened that summer and many supported cutting back on programs that benefited urban areas. In the Senate, Republicans took a largely different approach that month than those who were in the House with most Republican Senators supporting Johnson's anti urban poverty programs.

In the 1968 presidential primaries, the two factions of law and order along with social justice would clash in the Republican Party. Ronald Reagan would orientate himself as a law and order candidate, Nelson Rockefeller siding with the justice faction and Richard Nixon catering to both factions. Nixon would end up emerging victorious. Nixon called to control crime, scale back the War on Poverty and encourage black capitalism as a way to "restore urban areas".

On August 10, the Kerner Commission would recommend in a letter to President Johnson that they should substantially and immediately increase the amount of African Americans serving in the National Guard and Air National Guard. The reason being they though with more African-Americans serving in the National Guard it could be a more effective force at preventing civil disorder.

List of riots 
Some of the riots include:

See also
 2020–2022 United States racial unrest
 Ferguson unrest
 George Floyd protests
 King assassination riots
 List of incidents of civil unrest in the United States

References

Bibliography

Further reading
 Michael Omi and Howard Winant, Racial formation in the United States: from the 1960s to the 1990s (1994)
 Walter C. Rucker and James N. Upton, eds. Encyclopedia of American Race Riots (2007) 930 pages –

 
1967 riots
June 1967 events in the United States
July 1967 events in the United States
August 1967 events in the United States
Articles containing video clips
African-American riots in the United States
Riots and civil disorder in the United States
Ghetto riots (1964–1969)